The Weston meteorite is an H4 ordinary chondrite meteorite which fell to earth above the town of Weston, Connecticut on the morning of December 14, 1807.

History
The Weston meteorite fell to earth above the town of Weston, Connecticut at approximately 6:30 in the morning on December 14, 1807. The meteor fall was widely witnessed and reported in newspaper accounts at the time. Eyewitnesses reported three loud explosions, and stone fragments fell in at least six locations.

Debris field & Naming
Currently none of the area where the strewn field (the debris field where the bulk of the fragments fell) was located on is in the town of Weston, but in primarily located in neighboring Easton. The town of Easton was within and part of the town of Weston in 1807, hence the name Weston meteorite.

The majority of the debris field  is located in the eastern part of the present day town of Easton - in and around the Easton Reservoir. The remaining part of the debris field extended into the western part of neighboring Trumbull. Several fragments of this meteorite were collected in the Tashua section of Trumbull, in and around what is now Sturbridge Lane and Tashua Knolls.

Historical & Scientific Significance
Fragments from the fall were collected, documented, and chemically analyzed by Yale University professors Benjamin Silliman and James Luce Kingsley. The Weston meteorite is the first meteorite to fall in the New World which was documented in such a manner, marking the beginning of meteorite science in the United States. Fragments of the meteorite remain within the Yale meteorite collection, which is the oldest such collection in the United States.

The meteorite was also written on at the time by Nathaniel Bowditch, calculating size and trajectory of the meteor.

See also
Glossary of meteoritics

References 

Meteorite falls
Meteorites found in the United States
Geology of Connecticut